South Fork Orestimba Creek is a tributary stream of Orestimba Creek, in the Diablo Range in Stanislaus County, California.

References  

Rivers of Stanislaus County, California